Gymnastics at the 2014 South American Games in Santiago was held from March 8 to March 18.

Medal summary

Medal table

Gymnastics Artistic

Men

Women

Gymnastics Rhythmic

Medalists

References
 

2014 South American Games events
South American Games
2014 South American Games